Sylvia Buschhüter is a former professional pool player from Germany. She is a three-time European Pool Championships winner, and six-time German national champion. 

Buschhutter won a total of six national titles, beginning in 1984, winning a total of three straight pool titles, and one each in 8-ball, 9-ball and the cup event.

References

German pool players
female pool players
1962 births
living people